Les Petits As (English: Little champions) is a junior tennis tournament for players aged 12–14, held in Tarbes, France. 

The event has seen a number of its champions go on to become slam winners, including Rafael Nadal, Michael Chang, Martina Hingis, Kim Clijsters, Jeļena Ostapenko and Bianca Andreescu. Due to the relatively restrictive age range, few players have won the title more than once, although Hingis and Timea Bacsinszky have both done so. Most recently, upcoming Spanish player Carlos Boluda became the first boy to do so.

The tournament is played on indoor GreenSet (hard) courts. Roughly 7,000 players enter the pre-qualifying tournaments held across France, with that number being narrowed down to 350 for the final qualifying stage, and 64 for the final tournament. The event is regulated by the International Tennis Federation (ITF) and has businesses such as Head, Eurosport, Coca-Cola, and Peugeot amongst its portfolio of partners.

Results

Boys' singles

Girls' singles

Exhibitions
The tournament often features retired and/or active players making appearances in exhibition matches in the evening preceding the final day of play. It is common for upcoming and veteran French players to be present. In recent tournaments, players present have included:
2004: Yannick Noah and Henri Leconte.
2005: Juan Carlos Ferrero (a former champion) and David Nalbandian, who replaced compatriot and French Open champion Gastón Gaudio at the last minute.
2006: Rafael Nadal and Fabrice Santoro.
2007: Richard Gasquet and Gaël Monfils.
2008: Fabrice Santoro and Marc Gicquel, after Paul-Henri Mathieu and Jo-Wilfried Tsonga withdrew. Mathieu, who had injured himself at the 2008 Australian Open, signed autographs instead.

References

External links
Les Petits As website 
2008 Boys' Singles draw
2008 Girls' Singles draw

Junior tennis
Hard court tennis tournaments
Indoor tennis tournaments
Tennis tournaments in France